Sean Donnelly (born April 1, 1993) is an American track and field athlete specializing in the hammer throw. He won a bronze medal at the 2019 Pan American Games. In addition, he represented the Americas at the 2018 IAAF Continental Cup. He graduated from Mount Union University in 2014 and continued his education to the University of Minnesota.

His personal best in the event is 79.27 meters set in Tucson, Arizona in 2021.

International competitions

1Representing the Americas

References

1993 births
Living people
American male hammer throwers
Athletes (track and field) at the 2019 Pan American Games
Pan American Games track and field athletes for the United States
People from Willoughby, Ohio
Pan American Games medalists in athletics (track and field)
Pan American Games bronze medalists for the United States
Medalists at the 2019 Pan American Games
20th-century American people
21st-century American people